Janina Maria Andersson (born 28 February 1971) is a Finnish politician and former member of Finnish Parliament, representing the Green League. She has also held positions in various other organisations. She was first elected to the parliament in 1995 and served until 2011.

Andersson was born in Turku, Finland. She has a master's degree in political science from the Åbo Akademi. Andersson is married with two children.

References

External links
 Official Website of Janina Andersson  

1971 births
Living people
Politicians from Turku
Green League politicians
Members of the Parliament of Finland (1995–99)
Members of the Parliament of Finland (1999–2003)
Members of the Parliament of Finland (2003–07)
Members of the Parliament of Finland (2007–11)
Women members of the Parliament of Finland
21st-century Finnish women politicians
Åbo Akademi University alumni